Shaukat Thanvi (2 February 1904 – 4 May 1963) was a Pakistani writer and humorist.

Early life
Shaukat Thanvi was born in Brindaban, Mathura district, Uttar Pradesh, British India, on 2 February 1904. Thana Bhawan, a small town in Muzaffarnagar district (now in Shamli district) of Uttar Pradesh, was Thanvi's ancestral hometown and possibly the source of his last name, though Professor Mushtaq Azmi suggests that he adopted the name Thanvi because of his affection for the Islamic scholar Maulana Ashraf Ali Thanwi.

Career
Shaukat Thanvi had little formal schooling. Starting in 1928, he started working for an Urdu-language newspaper Hamdam from Lucknow, British India and continued working for several other Urdu newspapers.
Then he joined the radio station in Lucknow as a writer and a broadcaster after it was first established in 1938. He was doing mainly humorous talk shows at the radio station.

At the suggestion of Syed Imtiyaz Ali Taj, Thanvi joined Lahore's Pancholi Art Pictures as a story and songwriter in 1943. After the independence of Pakistan in 1947, Pancholi Art Pictures closed down and Shaukat Thanvi joined Radio Pakistan in Lahore. In 1957, Shaukat Thanvi joined the Daily Jang newspaper and started writing a humor column in it called "Vaghaira Vaghaira", which later became very popular among the Pakistani public.

Marriage
He was not married to the Pakistani television actress Arsh Muneer, contrary to popular belief. However, he was married twice, to Saeeda Khatoon and Zohra Begum.

Literary works
Thanvi wrote poetry while publishing more than sixty books.

His notable works include:
Sheesh Mahal 
 Saudeshi Rail (Native Train)

Awards and recognition
 Thanvi received the Tamgha-e-Imtiaz Award on 23 March 1963 from the President of Pakistan.

Death
Following his death on 4 May 1963, Thanvi's burial took place at Miani Sahib Graveyard, Lahore, which is located in front of Radio Pakistan.

Filmography
 Gulnaar (1963)

References

External links
Filmography of Shaukat Thanvi on IMDb website

1904 births
1963 deaths
People from Lahore
Muhajir people
Pakistani humorists
Pakistani novelists
Pakistani dramatists and playwrights
Urdu-language novelists
Pakistani male short story writers
Urdu-language short story writers
Pakistani radio personalities
Recipients of Tamgha-e-Imtiaz
20th-century novelists
20th-century Pakistani short story writers
Burials at Miani Sahib Graveyard
20th-century Pakistani male writers
People from Shamli district